The following is a list of Laplace transforms for many common functions of a single variable. The Laplace transform is an integral transform that takes a function of a positive real variable  (often time) to a function of a complex variable  (frequency).

Properties

The Laplace transform of a function  can be obtained using the formal definition of the Laplace transform. However, some properties of the Laplace transform can be used to obtain the Laplace transform of some functions more easily.

Linearity

 

and is, therefore, regarded as a linear operator.

Time shifting

Frequency shifting

Explanatory notes

The unilateral Laplace transform takes as input a function whose time domain is the non-negative reals, which is why all of the time domain functions in the table below are multiples of the Heaviside step function, .

The entries of the table that involve a time delay  are required to be causal (meaning that ). In general, the region of convergence for causal systems is not the same as that of anticausal systems.

The following functions and variables are used in the table below:

   represents the Dirac delta function.
  represents the Heaviside step function.
  represents the Gamma function.
  is the Euler–Mascheroni constant.
  is a real number. It typically represents time, although it can represent any independent dimension.
  is an integer.
  are real numbers.
  is a complex number.

Table

See also
 List of Fourier transforms

References

 
Mathematics-related lists